Menterwolde is a former municipality in the province of Groningen in the Netherlands.  On January 1, 2018, Menterwolde  merged with Hoogezand-Sappemeer and Slochteren, forming the municipality Midden-Groningen.

History 
On 1 January 1990, the municipalities of Meeden, Muntendam, and Oosterbroek merged to form Menterwolde.

Geography 

Menterwolde is located in the province of Groningen in the northeast of the Netherlands. It is situated in the west of the region of Oldambt.

Menterwolde is bordered by the municipalities of Slochteren in the northwest and north, Oldambt in the east, Pekela in the southeast, Veendam in the south, and Hoogezand-Sappemeer in the southwest and west.

The population centres in Menterwolde are the villages of Borgercompagnie, Meeden, Muntendam, Noordbroek, Tripscompagnie, and Zuidbroek.

Transportation 
The Zuidbroek railway station is located on the Harlingen–Nieuweschans railway and the Stadskanaal–Zuidbroek railway.

References

External links

 

Midden-Groningen
Former municipalities of Groningen (province)
Municipalities of the Netherlands disestablished in 2018